Kizer is a Jewish surname from the Netherlands and Ukraine. The surname is derived from the inhabitants of the village of Kizia, Lviv Oblast, Ukraine. Notable people with the surname include:

Carolyn Kizer (1925–2014), American poet
DeShone Kizer (born 1996), American football player
Kenneth Kizer, American businessman
Lynetta Kizer (born 1990), American basketball player
Noble Kizer (1900–1940), American football and basketball player
Rayshaun Kizer (born 1985), American football player

References 

Surnames of Ukrainian origin
Ukrainian-language surnames
Jewish surnames